Lenny Prince (born 1965) is a sculptor in glass and concrete, best known for his large installation pieces.

Early life  
Prince was born in Guyana. He moved to New York at the age of 20, first settling in Brooklyn.

Career 
Prince briefly worked as a mechanic. By 1996, he had saved enough money to open Half Price Mufflers. Prince opened Lenny's Creations, a gallery in Staten Island, NY.

Style 
Prince adopted a constructivist, cybernetic sculpture style. He makes junkyard still lifes.

Reception 
The New York Times dubbed him "The Matisse of Mufflers".

Work

Public collections 
Francis, a giant praying mantis, greets visitors outside the Staten Island Children's Museum in Snug Harbor, New York. He built a space shuttle sculpture out of scrap auto parts for Staten Island, New York.

Recognition 
His work was featured in the Staten Island Advance three times.

References

External links 
 Official website

Living people
1965 births
Artists  from New York City
Guyanese sculptors
20th-century American sculptors
21st-century American sculptors
Guyanese emigrants to the United States